Angraecum palmiforme is a species of orchid. It existed on Mauritius and Réunion, but is possibly extinct.

References 

palmiforme
Orchids of Réunion
Orchids of Mauritius